This is a list of edible flowers.

See also

Bushfood
Kitchen garden
Gardening
List of culinary herbs and spices
List of edible nuts
List of companion plants
List of poisonous flowers
Flower
Edible flowers
List of useful plants

References

flowers, edible
flowers, edible
'
flowers, edible
flowers, edible
'flowers